Aster bellidiastrum (also known as false aster) is a species of perennial plant from the family Asteraceae.

References

bellidiastrum
Plants described in 1759